State Trunk Highway 132 (often called Highway 132, STH-132 or WIS 132) was a state highway in the U.S. state of Wisconsin. The highway ran through Grant County.

History
The highway number was designated in 1923, from WIS 11 (now US 61) in Boscobel to Mount Hope. In 1968, the section from US 61 to US 18 north of Mount Hope became part of WIS 133, leaving the highway as a short spur from US 18 to Mount Hope. The highway was decommissioned in 1993 and became part of County Highway J.

Major intersections

See also

References

132
Transportation in Grant County, Wisconsin